Chae Gwang-seok (born 25 February 1962) is a South Korean gymnast. He competed in eight events at the 1984 Summer Olympics.

References

External links
 

1962 births
Living people
South Korean male artistic gymnasts
Olympic gymnasts of South Korea
Gymnasts at the 1984 Summer Olympics
Place of birth missing (living people)